The Melbourne–Adelaide rail corridor is a standard-gauge railway corridor that runs  between the cities of Melbourne, Victoria and Adelaide, South Australia. Most of the current traffic is freight; the only passenger train along the entire route is the twice-weekly passenger service The Overland, operated by Journey Beyond.

History

In the second half of the nineteenth century, the Victorian Railways and South Australian Railways broad gauge networks were extended. The South Australian main line, the Adelaide-Wolseley line, was connected to the Victorian system at Serviceton in 1887. This was the first single gauge inter-colonial link in Australia.

Conversion to standard gauge and rerouting

In 1983, studies by VicRail and Australian National suggested figures of about $400 million to construct a standard-gauge link. Various routes were considered, including via Serviceton and Ararat, and via Pinnaroo, Ouyen and Maryborough.

In 1995, the line was converted to standard gauge, under the One Nation program and rerouted between Melbourne and Ararat in Victoria, to run on the line via North Shore and Cressy.

Track and gauge

The line is single track the entire route with the exception of a short dual gauge section near Melbourne, and a number of  passing loops every .

Some branches have also been converted to standard gauge.

References

Sources

Railway lines in South Australia
Railway lines in Victoria (Australia)
5 ft 3 in gauge railways in Australia
Standard gauge railways in Australia
Rail infrastructure in Australia
Interstate rail in Australia
Railway lines opened in 1887
1887 establishments in Australia